Basin Pocket is a suburb of Ipswich in the City of Ipswich, Queensland, Australia.

Geography
The suburb is bordered to the north and west by the Bremer River, and to the east and south by East Ipswich.

The land use is almost entirely residential apart from parkland along the riverbank. There are no shops in the suburb but there a small set of shops providing basic services on the corner of Chermside Road and Jacaranda Street in East Ipswich just beyond the south-eastern boundary of Basin Pocket.

History
The origin of the suburb name is derived from "The Basin", an enlarged natural widening used by river steamers to turn before or after berthing at Ipswich, to which the suburb is adjacent. The explorer Allan Cunningham noted the Basin in 1828, and the Rev. Dr John Dunmore Lang suggested that Basin Pocket or Booval might have been a better site for the main settlement.

A ferry service between Basin Pocket and North Ipswich was established by William Isaac Lawrence sometime after his family settled there in the 1860s. (This service does not exist today).

On 15 March 1887, there was a ceremony to turn the first sod for a Primitive Methodist church. Basin Pocket Primitive Methodist Church opened on Sunday 8 December 1867. Services had been held in a rented house for about year prior to the opening of the church. On Tuesday 19 December 1867 (the public holiday for Separation Day), a tea meeting was held for 200 people to celebrate the opening of the church.

St John's Anglican Church was opened on 3 September 1921 by Canon T. L. H. Jenkyn, the rector of St Paul's Anglican Church in Ipswich. It was dedicated on 11 September 1921 by Archbishop Gerald Sharp. Its closure circa 2018 was approved by Bishop Cameron Venables. The church was at 82 Blackall Street.

St Philomene's Catholic Church was dedicated on 2 June 1940 by Archbishop James Duhig.

At the  Basin Pocket recorded a population of 861 people.

In the  Basin Pocket had a population of 890 people.

Education 
There are no schools in Basin Pocket. The nearest primary school is Ipswich East State School in neighbouring East Ipswich to the south-east. The nearest government secondary schools are Bremer State High School in Ipswich to the south-west and Bundamba State Secondary College in Bundamba to the south-east.

Amenities 
Other amenities include:
J Perrett Memorial Park
McLeod Street Park and Planned Boat Ramp
Horace J Harper Band Hall (Home of the Ipswich Model Band Est.1906 - the oldest surviving Brass, Concert Band in Ipswich)
West End Football Club

References

External links

 

Suburbs of Ipswich, Queensland